Foerstellites is a genus of Ordovician cephalopods from North America, belonging to the family Endoceratidae, in which the  siphuncle takes up the entire apex.

Foestellites, named by Kobayashi, 1940, is based on the apical part of the conch, or shell, which expands rapidly as septa are added. Not a true nanno type, since the siphuncle is not truly swollen at the apex. Probably the apical end of Cameroceras or Vaginoceras.

References

 Flower, Rousseau H.1958. Some Chazyan and Mohawkian Endoceratida. Jour of Paleontology, V.32, n3, pp433–458, May 1958
 Teichert, C. 1964. Endoceratoidea, Treatise on Invertebrate Paleontology, part K. Geological Society of America and Univ. Kansas Press.

Prehistoric nautiloid genera